Renyldo Pedro Guimarães Ferreira (born 29 June 1923) is a Brazilian former equestrian who competed in the 1948 Summer Olympics, in the 1952 Summer Olympics, in the 1956 Summer Olympics, and in the 1960 Summer Olympics.

References

External links
 

1923 births
Living people
Brazilian male equestrians
Olympic equestrians of Brazil
Equestrians at the 1948 Summer Olympics
Equestrians at the 1952 Summer Olympics
Equestrians at the 1956 Summer Olympics
Equestrians at the 1960 Summer Olympics
Pan American Games medalists in equestrian
Pan American Games gold medalists for Brazil
Pan American Games silver medalists for Brazil
Equestrians at the 1959 Pan American Games
Equestrians at the 1967 Pan American Games
Medalists at the 1959 Pan American Games
Medalists at the 1967 Pan American Games
21st-century Brazilian people
20th-century Brazilian people